"The Young New Mexican Puppeteer" is a song written by Earl Shuman and Leon Carr, and released as a single by Tom Jones. The guitarist on the single is Big Jim Sullivan.

Song background
The song tells the story of a puppeteer from New Mexico, who uses puppets to encourage social and political change. The melody of the song's chorus is adapted from the score of the 1940 Disney film Pinocchio.

Chart performance
It reached #6 on the UK Singles Chart, and was a minor hit in the US, peaking at #14 on the Easy Listening chart and #80 on the Billboard Hot 100 in May 1972.

References

Songs about Mexico
Songs about occupations
1972 singles
Tom Jones (singer) songs
Decca Records singles
Puppetry
Songs with lyrics by Earl Shuman
Songs with music by Leon Carr